Anicia Brianna Fortino (née Van Buren, born August 4, 1993) is a  mixed martial artist (MMA) fighter from the United States, competing in the strawweight division for UFC. She is a former Invicta FC Strawweight Champion.  As of April 25, 2022, she is #15 in the UFC women's strawweight rankings

Background
Van Buren grew up in Gilroy, California with her mother. Due to the domestic sexual molestation that she was a victim of in her teens, she moved out of home at the age of 13. She ended up moving in with her uncle – Strikeforce veteran Anthony Figueroa – at whose gym she started training kickboxing, later picking up other disciplines. She attended and graduated from Gilroy High School where she played soccer and wrestled her sophomore year.

Mixed martial arts career

Early career 
Van Buren started her professional MMA career in 2012 and fought primarily in California. She amassed a record of 3–1 prior to being signed by Invicta FC.

Invicta Fighting Championships
Van Buren made her Invicta FC debut on February 27, 2015 at Invicta FC 11: Cyborg vs. Tweet against Amy Montenegro. She lost the fight via unanimous decision.

Van Buren next faced Jamie Moyle on December 15, 2018 at  Invicta FC 33: Frey vs. Grusander II. Moyle missed weight by nine pounds, weighing in at 125.1 lbs and forfeiting 25% of her purse to Van Buren. She won the fight by unanimous decision.

On May 3, 2019, Van Buren competed in the first Phoenix Series tournament. A new one-night tournament to determine a new strawweight champion. In the opening round, she faced Manjit Kolekar and won the fight via submission by way of armbar in the first round. She moved on to face Juliana Lima in the semi-finals, winning the fight via unanimous decision. In the finals, Van Buren faced Kailin Curran. She submitted Curran in the second round with a rear naked choke to become the new Invicta FC Strawweight Champion. She would later vacate her title in order to sign with the UFC.

Ultimate Fighting Championship
On her UFC debut, she faced Lívia Renata Souza, replacing injured Cynthia Calvillo, on July 13, 2019 at UFC Fight Night: de Randamie vs. Ladd. She won by unanimous decision.

Van Buren faced Tecia Torres on June 20, 2020 at UFC Fight Night: Blaydes vs. Volkov. She lost the fight via unanimous decision.

Fortino was scheduled to face Jessica Penne on July 16, 2022, at UFC on ABC 3. However, Fortino withdrew in early June for unknown reasons and was replaced by Emily Ducote.

Personal life 
Van Buren's moniker "Tha Bull" or "The Bull" was coined by her grandfather when she was young as she used to running around with such attitude that her grandfather called her "El Torito", "The baby bull" in Spanish.

Brianna and her husband Lukas Fortino got married in October 2020, and she officially began using Fortino as her last name also in the UFC. The pair welcomed their first son Jackson in 2021.

Championships and accomplishments

Mixed martial arts 
 Invicta Fighting Championships
 Invicta FC Strawweight Champion (one time)

Mixed martial arts record

|-
| Loss
| align=center| 7–3
| Tecia Torres
| Decision (unanimous)
| UFC on ESPN: Blaydes vs. Volkov
| 
| align=center| 3
| align=center| 5:00
| Las Vegas, Nevada, United States
|
|-
| Win
| align=center| 7–2
| Lívia Renata Souza
| Decision (unanimous)
| UFC Fight Night: de Randamie vs. Ladd
| 
| align=center| 3
| align=center| 5:00
| Sacramento, California, United States
|
|-
| Win
| align=center| 6–2
| Kailin Curran
| Submission (rear-naked choke)
|Invicta Phoenix Series 1 
| 
| align=center| 2
| align=center| 3:49
|Kansas City, Kansas, United States
|
|-
| Win
| align=center| 5–2
| Jamie Moyle
| Decision (unanimous)
| Invicta FC 33: Frey vs. Grusander II
| 
| align=center| 3
| align=center| 5:00
| Kansas City, Missouri, United States
|
|-
| Win
| align=center| 4–2
| Angela Samaro
| Submission (rear-naked choke)
| URCC 34
| 
| align=center| 1
| align=center| 2:37
| Richmond, California, United States
|
|-
| Loss
| align=center| 3–2
| Amy Montenegro
| Decision (unanimous)
| Invicta FC 11: Cyborg vs. Tweet
| 
| align=center| 3
| align=center| 5:00
| Los Angeles, California, United States
|
|-
| Win
| align=center| 3–1
| Katie Klimansky-Casimir
| TKO (retirement)
| Rogue Fights 26
| 
| align=center| 1
| align=center| 5:00
| Redding, California, United States
|
|-
| Win
| align=center| 2–1
| Patricia Vidonic
| Decision (unanimous)
| Rogue Fights 25
| 
| align=center| 3
| align=center| 5:00
| Redding, California, United States
|
|-
| Loss
| align=center| 1–1
| Stephanie Eggink
| Decision (unanimous)
| XFC 23
| 
| align=center| 3
| align=center| 5:00
| Louisville, Kentucky, United States
|
|-
| Win
| align=center| 1–0
| Charlene Gellner
| KO (punch)
| Rogue Fights 20
| 
| align=center| 1
| align=center| 2:37
| Redding, California, United States
|
|-

Mixed martial arts exhibition record

|-
| Win
| align=center| 5–2
| Juliana Lima
| Decision (unanimous)
|Invicta Phoenix Series 1 
|  
| align=center| 1
| align=center| 5:00
| Kansas City, Kansas, United States
|
|-
| Win
| align=center| 5–2
| Manjit Kolekar
| Submission (armbar)
|Invicta Phoenix Series 1 
|  
| align=center| 1
| align=center| 3:20
| Kansas City, Kansas, United States 
|
|-

See also
List of current Invicta FC fighters
List of female mixed martial artists

References

External links
 
 

1993 births
Living people
American practitioners of Brazilian jiu-jitsu
Female Brazilian jiu-jitsu practitioners
American female mixed martial artists
Strawweight mixed martial artists
Mixed martial artists utilizing wrestling
Mixed martial artists utilizing Brazilian jiu-jitsu
Ultimate Fighting Championship female fighters
21st-century American women